George Hennessey (October 28, 1907 – January 15, 1988) was a professional baseball player who played pitcher in the Major Leagues from 1937 to 1945. Born in Slatington, Pennsylvania, he played for the St. Louis Browns, Philadelphia Phillies, and Chicago Cubs.

Hennessey died in Princeton, New Jersey, aged 80.

References

External links
, or Retrosheet

1907 births
1988 deaths
Major League Baseball pitchers
St. Louis Browns players
Philadelphia Phillies players
Chicago Cubs players
York White Roses players
Nashville Vols players
Ozark Eagles players
Trenton Packers players
Shreveport Sports players
Trenton Senators players
Northern Lehigh High School alumni
Baseball players from Pennsylvania
Federalsburg A's players
Sportspeople from Lehigh County, Pennsylvania